Ashwani Sharma (born 23 January 1964) is an Indian politician and the current Bharatiya Janta Party (BJP) Punjab president. He is a member of Punjab Legislative Assembly and currently representing Pathankot Assembly constituency.

Early life
Sharma was born in a lower-middle-class  Punjabi Hindu family on 23 January 1964. His father Pandit Uma Dutt Sharma was a devoted Hindu, a renowned pandit (priest) and astrologer in the district Gurdaspur. His family had migrated to Gurdaspur from Sialkot after partition.

Ashwani Kumar Sharma did his early schooling from Vivekananda Model High School, Pathankot and went to do his graduation from Guru Nanak Dev University in Bachelor of Arts.

Politics
Sharma was involved with RSS. During his college days in Pathankot, he was a member of ABVP. 
After a successful term he was appointed General Secretary BJP Punjab from 2007 to 2010. Meanwhile, he became Chairman of District Planning Board Gurdaspur. He was made State President in 2010.

He was made the President B.J.Y.M. (Pb) in 2004. After a successful term he was appointed General Secretary BJP Punjab from 2007 to 2010.

MLA
He became Chairman of District Planning Board Gurdaspur. He was elected as BJP Punjab State President in 2010. Under his leadership party performed exceptionally well in 2012 legislative elections by winning all the Vidhan Sabha seats for BJP in Dist. Pathankot and contributed in building SAD-BJP alliance and was able to repeat the coalition government in Punjab after 43 years and also became member of legislative assembly in 2012.

He was elected as MLA in 2022. The Aam Aadmi Party gained a strong 79% majority in the sixteenth Punjab Legislative Assembly by winning 92 out of 117 seats in the 2022 Punjab Legislative Assembly election. MP Bhagwant Mann was sworn in as Chief Minister on 16 March 2022.

Electoral performance

References

Punjab, India MLAs 2022–2027
Place of birth missing (living people)
Living people
Punjab, India MLAs 2012–2017
People from Pathankot district
Guru Nanak Dev University alumni
Bharatiya Janata Party politicians from Punjab
1964 births